Vardåsen is a hill and the highest point in the municipality of Enebakk, Norway. It is located between the two lakes Børtervann and Øyeren, and has a height of 374 m.a.s.l.

References

Enebakk